The Russian Church, officially known as the Church of St Nicholas the Miracle-Maker, is a Russian Orthodox church in central Sofia, Bulgaria situated on Tsar Osvoboditel Boulevard.

History and architecture
The church was built on the site of the Saray Mosque, which was destroyed in 1882, after the liberation of Bulgaria by Russia from the Ottoman Empire. It was built as the official church of the Russian Embassy, which was located next door, and of the Russian community in Sofia, and was named, as was the tradition for diplomatic churches, for the patron saint of the Emperor who ruled Russia at the time, Nicholas II of Russia. The church was designed by the Russian architect Mikhail Preobrazhenski in the style of Russian Revival architecture, with decoration inspired by the Muscovite Russian churches of the 17th century. The construction was supervised by the architect A. Smirnov, who was building the Alexander Nevsky Cathedral nearby.  The exterior decoration of multicolored  tiles was done by G. Kislichev, and the interior murals were painted by a team of artists led by Vasily Perminov, who also painted those in Alexander Nevsky Cathedral. The five domes are coated with gold.  The bells were donated by Emperor Nicholas II.

Construction began in 1907 and the church was consecrated in 1914.  The church remained open after the Russian Revolution and during the Communist period in Bulgaria (1944–1989), though priests and church-goers were carefully watched by the State Security police.

The exterior was recently restored by the Russian Government. The interior murals are darkened by smoke from candles and from time, and are in need of restoration.

The crypt housing the remains of Saint Archbishop Seraphim is located beneath the Russian Church's main floor. Dozens of people still visit the grave of the archbishop, who died in 1950, praying and leaving notes asking for wishes to be granted.

See also
List of churches in Sofia

References
Official Guide to the Russian Church by N. Neshkov and N. Lobanova (in Russian and Bulgarian)
Historical Plaque in front of the Russian Church, placed by the Ministry of Culture of Bulgaria

External links

 Official site
 Historical photographs of the church

Churches in Sofia
Churches completed in 1914
20th-century Eastern Orthodox church buildings
Russian Orthodox church buildings
Russian Revival architecture
Eastern Orthodox church buildings in Bulgaria
20th-century churches in Bulgaria